Simon Dawbarn may refer to:
 Spike Dawbarn (Simon James Dawbarn), English singer and dancer
 Simon Dawbarn (diplomat), British diplomat